Manbhum District was one of the districts of the East India during the British Raj. After India's independence, the district became a part of Bihar State. Upon re-organisation of the Indian states in the mid-1950s, present Purulia district was carved out of the district of Manbhum and became a part of the West Bengal; the remaining part of Manbhum district was kept with Bihar state and became part of Dhanbad district.

Etymology

Manbhum gets its name from the 16th century military general Man Singh I who is known for his conquests Of Bihar, Odisha and parts of Bengal. He later also served as the governor (Subahdar) of this region during the reign of King Akbar.

The district name derived from Manbazar or Manbhum Khas parganas. The headquarters of Jangal mahal region from around 1833 to 1838, when the district was formed.

History

See also
Jungle Mahals
Bengali Language Movement (Manbhum)
Bihar and Orissa Province

References

Source 

 

Bengal Presidency
Former districts of Bihar